The Europe/Africa Zone was one of three zones of regional competition in the 1999 Fed Cup.

Group I
Venue: La Manga Club, Murcia, Spain (outdoor clay)
Date: 19–23 April

The sixteen teams were divided into four pools of four teams. The top two teams of each pool play-off in a two-round knockout stage to decide which nations progress to World Group II Play-offs. The four nations coming last in the pools were relegated down to Group II for 2000.

Pools

Knockout stage

  and  advanced to World Group II Play-offs.

Group II
Venue: La Manga Club, Murcia, Spain (outdoor clay)
Date: 26–30 April

The twenty teams were randomly divided into four pools of five teams to compete in round-robin competitions. The teams that finished first in the pools would progress to Group I for 2000.

Pools

See also
Fed Cup structure

References

 Fed Cup Profile, South Africa
 Fed Cup Profile, Ukraine
 Fed Cup Profile, Latvia
 Fed Cup Profile, Romania
 Fed Cup Profile, Sweden
 Fed Cup Profile, Greece
 Fed Cup Profile, Great Britain
 Fed Cup Profile, Bulgaria
 Fed Cup Profile, Finland
 Fed Cup Profile, Slovenia
 Fed Cup Profile, Luxembourg
 Fed Cup Profile, Poland
 Fed Cup Profile, Hungary
 Fed Cup Profile, Bosnia and Herzegovina
 Fed Cup Profile, Madagascar
 Fed Cup Profile, Egypt
 Fed Cup Profile, Israel
 Fed Cup Profile, Moldova
 Fed Cup Profile, Tunisia
 Fed Cup Profile, Armenia
 Fed Cup Profile, Morocco
 Fed Cup Profile, Estonia
 Fed Cup Profile, Lithuania
 Fed Cup Profile, Cyprus
 Fed Cup Profile, Turkey
 Fed Cup Profile, Ireland
 Fed Cup Profile, Malta
 Fed Cup Profile, Algeria

External links
 Fed Cup website

 
Europe Africa
Sport in Murcia
Tennis tournaments in Spain
Fed